Jeffrey Shih ( born June 28, 1987), also known by his username Trump or TrumpSC, is an American professional video game player who streams Hearthstone, Age of Empires 4, and previously Starcraft II.

Before joining Team SoloMid in 2014, Shih grew his channel into one of the most popular Hearthstone streams on the game streaming website Twitch. He is one of the top Hearthstone competitors in North America.

He formerly played StarCraft II for the Team Legion and Vega Squadron groups.

Career
Shih graduated from New York University with a bachelor's degree in management and finance in 2009. Around that time he began working at a bank and streaming himself playing Starcraft II in his free time, averaging a few thousand concurrent viewers a stream. Shih's main intention behind his nickname Trump was to use the verb form of the word "trump", meaning "supersede".

Eventually Trump decided to quit his job and began streaming full-time, making a living from Twitch's partnership program by earning revenue from advertisements and subscriptions. He later began playing and streaming Hearthstone starting in the game's beta phase.

Trump has been described as "the world's most famous Hearthstone player", attracting over 20,000 concurrent viewers on his stream. In 2014, Shih streamed for seven hours per day. On October 13, 2013, he was signed by Team Razer as the world's first professional Hearthstone player.

In the Blizzard 2013 Stream Awards, Shih won the "Most Educational Stream" category with 43% of the vote, and came second in the "Favorite Hearthstone Stream" category. Shih's Hearthstone decks are often used as examples for new players. Blizzard Entertainment, creators of Hearthstone, cited streamers like Trump as reasons they were happy to continue with the game's monetization model after he reached the game's highest ranks without spending any money.

In July 2014 Trump joined Team SoloMid. He left Team SoloMid in March 2017 and signed to Tempo Storm as a player and content creator for the team. Tempo Storm parted ways with Shih in October 2018.

Tournament results
 7-8th — 2015 Hearthstone World Championship - Americas Championship

Personal life
Trump was born on June 28, 1987, in South Bay of the San Francisco Bay Area. He is an only child. He attended New York University's Stern School of Business from 2005 to 2009. Trump lived in the San Francisco Bay Area until June 2016, when he moved to Austin, Texas.

References

External links
 Trump's Twitch channel
 Trump's Decks

Living people
1987 births
American people of Chinese descent
Hearthstone players
People from the San Francisco Bay Area
People from Austin, Texas
Place of birth missing (living people)
New York University Stern School of Business alumni
StarCraft players
American people of Taiwanese descent
American esports players
Team SoloMid players
Sportspeople from New York City
Taiwanese esports players
Team Razer players
Tempo Storm players
Twitch (service) streamers